Saulchoy is a commune in the Pas-de-Calais department in the Hauts-de-France region of France.

Geography
Saulchoy is located 8 miles (12 km) southeast of Montreuil-sur-Mer at the junction of the D137E1 and D119 roads, by the banks of the river Authie, the border with the Somme department.  There's both a bar and a restaurant on the village green.

Population

Places of interest
 The church of St. Martin, dating from the fifteenth century

See also
Communes of the Pas-de-Calais department

References

Communes of Pas-de-Calais